Lost in the Game: The Soundtrack is the soundtrack to the 2005 drama film, Lost in the Game. It was released on April 11, 2009, through Villain Entertainment and consisted primarily of hip hop music.

Track listing 

MC Ren albums
Drama film soundtracks
Hip hop soundtracks
2009 soundtrack albums
Gangsta rap soundtracks